Venturi is a surname. Notable people with the surname include:

Adolfo Venturi (1856-1941), Italian art historian
Arcadio Venturi (born 1929), retired Italian professional footballer
Carlo Antonio Venturi, (1805–1864) Italian mycologist
Edgardo Venturi (born 1962), former Italian rugby union player and a current sports director
Emilie Ashurst Venturi (1821–1893), British artist, writer, and activist
Federico Venturi (1940–2020), Italian paleontologist
Franco Venturi (1914-1994), Italian historian, essayist and journalist
Giacomo Venturi (born 1992), Italian footballer 
Giovanni Battista Venturi (1746–1822), Italian physicist
Giorgio Venturi (born 1966), former Italian shot putter 
Gustavo Venturi (1830-1898), Italian bryologist
Maurizio Venturi (born 1957), Italian professional football coach and a former player
Giovanni Host-Venturi, also known as "Nino" Host-Venturi (1892–1980), Italian fascist politician and historian
Ken Venturi (1931–2013), American professional golfer
Lionello Venturi (1885-1961), Italian historian and critic of art
Pietro Venturi, Italian lawyer and politician, Mayor of Rome (1875–77)
Pietro Tacchi Venturi (1861—1956), Italian Roman Catholic Jesuit priest and historian, unofficial liaison between Benito Mussolini and popes Pius XI and Pius XII
Remo Venturi (born 1927), Italian motorcycle racer
Rick Venturi (born 1946), American football coach
Robert Venturi (1925–2018), American architect
Stefano Venturi del Nibbio (fl. 1592–1600), Italian composer of the late Renaissance, active in Venice and Florence
Varo Venturi-Clementini (born 1956), Italian film director and musician

Given name
 Venturi Salimbeni, or Ventura Salimebeni (1568 – 1613), Italian Counter-Maniera painter and printmaker

Fictional characters
Derek Venturi
Edwin Venturi
Marti Venturi
George Venturi

Italian-language surnames
it:Venturi